The Technical Supervisory Authority for Cableways was the Norwegian authority responsible for cableways, including cable cars, aerial tramways, funiculars, ski lifts and similar installations. The authority has since 1 July 1977 been performed by the Trondheim office of Det Norske Veritas (DNV) on contract with the Norwegian Ministry of Transport and Communications. The agency is self-financing and covers its costs through fees based on the services provided. The agency was dissolved on 1 January 2012 and the responsibility transferred to the Norwegian Railway Authority.

References

Cableways
Government agencies established in 1977
Organisations based in Trondheim
Transport authorities of Norway
DNV GL
1977 establishments in Norway
2012 disestablishments in Norway
Ministry of Transport (Norway)